ALX homeobox protein 1 is a protein that in humans is encoded by the ALX1 gene.

Function 

The specific function of this gene has yet to be determined in humans; however, in rodents, it is necessary for survival of the forebrain mesenchyme and may also be involved in development of the cervix. Mutations in the mouse gene lead to neural tube defects such as acrania and meroanencephaly.

In Darwin's finches, inhabiting the Galapagos islands, ALX1 has been linked to the diversity of beak shapes.

Interactions 

ALX1 has been shown to interact with IPO13.

References

Further reading

External links